Spevack is a surname. Notable people with the surname include:

Jason Spevack (born 1997), Canadian actor
Jerome S. Spevack, Canadian scientist, inventor, and engineer
Melodee Spevack (born 1953), American actress
Ysanne Spevack (born 1972), British composer, conductor, and arranger